Cystiscinae are a taxonomic subfamily of minute sea snails. These are marine gastropod mollusks or micromollusks in the family Cystiscidae, and the clade Neogastropoda.

Diagnosis 
Shell minute to small, white; spire immersed to low; surface smooth or axially costate; lip thickened, smooth or denticulate; external varix absent; siphonal notch absent; posterior notch absent; columella multiplicate, with combined total of usually 2 to 8 plications plus parietal lirae; internal whorls cystiscid type. Animal mantle smooth, at least partially extending over external shell surface. Internal anatomy unknown.

Genera
Genera within the subfamily Cystiscinae are as follows:
Crithe Gould, 1860
Cystiscus Stimpson, 1865:55
Extra Jousseaume, 1894 - with the only species Extra extra Jousseaume, 1894
Gibberula Swainson, 1840
Inbiocystiscus Ortea and Espinosa, 2001
Intelcystiscus Ortea and Espinosa, 2001
†Marginocystiscus Landau, C. M. Silva & Heitz, 2016
Pachybathron Gaskoin, 1853
Persicula Schumacher, 1817
Ticocystiscus Espinosa and Ortea, 2002
Ticofurcilla Espinosa & Ortea, 2002
†Topaginella Laseron, 1957:288

Comparative shell structure of three genera

References

  2002. Nuevas especies de margineliformes de Cuba, Bahamas y el Mar Caribe de Costa Rica Avicennia 15:101-128.
  2001. Intelcystiscus e Inbiocystiscus (Mollusca: Neogastrópoda: Cystiscidae) dos nuevos géneros del Atlántico occidental tropical. Avicennia 14 107-114.

Cystiscidae
Taxa named by William Stimpson